Karl Gatermann (July 19, 1883 – February 14, 1959), typically referred to as Karl Gatermann the Elder, was a German painter and graphic artist. He was the uncle of artist Karl Gatermann, who is typically called "Karl Gatermann the Younger" to distinguish between the two.

Life 
Gatermann was born in Mölln, in 1883. His mother was part of a family of musicians. After completion of elementary school in Mölln, he completed an apprenticeship as a decorator. He traveled between Dessau, Munich and Hesse from 1901 to 1903. Then he studied at the art school on Lübeck under Leo von Lütgendorff from 1904 to 1907. The financial support of the Lübeck physician and local researcher Rudolf Struck (Gatermann illustrated Struck's books The Old Civic Residence in Lübeck, Volumes I and II) enabled him to study in Munich's Academy of Fine Arts. There he studied from 1907 to 1914 and became master-student with Hugo von Habermann.

In 1910 he received the First Prize for Painting of the City of Munich for the oil painting Life.

From 1919 to 1942 he lived and worked in Lübeck. In 1919 he became a co-founder and temporarily second chairman of the Lübecker Bildender Künstler. In the summer of 1922 he accompanied Rudolf von Laban and his dance group, creating an expressive cycle of movement studies. In Berlin in 1923 and 1925, he exhibited his watercolors in the galleries of Rudolf Wiltschek and in the Kunsthaus Heumann in Hamburg in 1926. Wiltschek conducted a Berlin-London art exchange with a London gallery; Gatermann's watercolors were also shown in England and in the London Times. In 1928, he became acquainted with the painters Otto Niemeyer-Holstein, Ernst Frick, Albert Kohler and the writer Werner von der Schulenburg. In 1942, during the allied bombing of Lübeck, about 100 of his oil paintings and 125 watercolors were destroyed. He died of a stroke in 1959.

Works
Gatermann predominantly focused on north German landscapes and cities, though he also painted still life and figurative scenes, and portraits of people including Marie Curie, Wilhelm Furtwangler, Otto Bernheimer, Julius Eugen Kopsch, Hans-Peter Mainzberg, and Otto Anthes.

References 
 Gustav Lindtke: Alte Lübecker Stadtansichten, Lübecker Museumshefte, Heft 7, Lübeck 1968, S. 99
 Bernd Gatermann: Karl Gatermann - Ein Leben der Kunst gewidmet. Kommissionsverlag Weiland, Lübeck 1973, 44 Seiten, 5 Abb., davon 4 in Farbe.
 Wulf Schadendorf: Museum Behnhaus. Das Haus und seine Räume. Malerei, Skulptur, Kunsthandwerk (= Lübecker Museumskataloge 3). 2. erweiterte und veränderte Auflage. Museum für Kunst u. Kulturgeschichte d. Hansestadt, Lübeck 1976, S. 59
 Bernd Gatermann und Peter Guttkuhn: Zur Eule. Erinnerungen an eine Lübecker Künstlerkneipe. In: Der Wagen. Ein Lübeckisches Jahrbuch. Lübeck 1986, Seiten 176-183. . .
 Horst Hannemann: Gatermann, Karl. In: Biographisches Lexikon für Schleswig-Holstein und Lübeck. Neumünster 1987, Bd. 8, S. 148 ff., auch in: Alken Bruns (Hrsg.): Lübecker Lebensläufe aus neun Jahrhunderten. Neumünster 1993, S. 141 ff.
 Allgemeines Künstlerlexikon. Saur Verlag, 2006, Bd. 50, S. 103 f.
 Klaus J. Dorsch: SEHENS-WERTES, Katalog des Kreismuseums Herzogtum Lauenburg im Herrenhaus zu Ratzeburg, 2006, Karl Gatermann (1883–1959) S. 106 ff. mit 5 Abb.
 ArtProfil, Zeitschrift für aktuelle Kunst: Karl Gatermann und Otto Pippel. Heft 3/2007, S. 13 f. mit 4 Abb.
 Bernd Gatermann und Peter-Alexander Hanke: Melodien von Karl Gatermann d. Ä. zu Fredmans Episteln von C. M. Bellman. Selbstverlag, Ratzeburg 2008, 154 Seiten, 11 Abb., davon 6 in Farbe.
 Bernd Gatermann: Karl Gatermann d.  Ä. - Facetten eines bewegten Künstlerlebens. In: Der Wagen 2010. Lübecker Beiträge zur Kultur und Gesellschaft. Seiten 147 - 161 mit 19 Abb. in Farbe.
 Peter-Alexander Hanke und Bernd Gatermann: Der Maler Karl Gatermann d. Ä., Leben und Werk. Selbstverlag, Ratzeburg 2005, 726 Seiten, 427 Abb., davon 174 in Farbe. - Die 2. überarbeitete und ergänzte Auflage 2011 enthält auf 802 Seiten 477 Abb., davon 199 in Farbe.
 Alexander Bastek und Jacob Helbo Jensen: MØDER / BEGEGNUNGEN, Deutsche und dänische Malerei 1860-1960, Ss. 44 f. und 167. . Michael Imhof Verlag 2016. Zweisprachiger Katalog der Ausstellung im dänischen Fuglsang Kunstmuseum auf der Insel Lolland und im Museum Behnhaus Drägerhaus Lübeck.

External links 
 Über Veranstaltungen zu Sonderausstellung: Karl Gatermann
 Karl Gatermann der Ältere - Leben und Werk
 Thomas Illmaier: Welt der Sinne. Karl Gatermann und die Welt des Impressionismus. In: Bergische Blätter, Wuppertal, 3/1998, S. 26
 Thomas Illmaier: Visionen des letzten Impressionisten. In: DER WEG, Evangelische Wochenzeitung für das Rheinland, 44/1997, S. 10
 Flandrisches Kaleidoskop
 Literatur über Karl Gatermann bei Google Books
  NORDMUS bringt deutsche und dänische Museen zusammen.

1883 births
1959 deaths
People from Mölln, Schleswig-Holstein
People from the Province of Schleswig-Holstein
20th-century German painters
20th-century German male artists
German graphic designers
German male painters
German landscape painters